The Trans-European high-speed rail network (TEN-R), together with the Trans-European conventional rail network, make up the Trans-European Rail network, which in turn is one of a number of the European Union's Trans-European transport networks (TEN-T). It was defined by the Council Directive 96/48/EC of 23 July 1996.

The European Union council decision 2002/735/EC defines technical standards for interoperability of the system.

Description 
The aim of this EU Directive is to achieve the interoperability of the European high-speed train network at the various stages of its design, construction and operation.

The network is defined as a system consisting of a set of infrastructures, fixed installations, logistic equipment and rolling stock.

By definition of the EC decision, a high-speed line must have one of these three infrastructure characteristics:
 specially built high-speed lines equipped for speeds generally equal to or greater than 
 specially upgraded high-speed lines equipped for speeds of the order of 
 specially upgraded high-speed lines which have special features as a result of topographical, relief or town-planning constraints, on which the speed must be adapted to each case.

The rolling stock used on these lines must be compatible with the characteristics of the infrastructure.

Along important listed rail routes (TEN-T), the railway shall be of high speed type, either when new parts are built, or when upgrades are made. This creates a quality requirement on these projects.

Corridors

 Corridor 1 – Berlin–Palermo
 Corridor 2 – London, Paris, Amsterdam and Cologne to Brussels
 Corridor 3 – Lisbon–Madrid
 Corridor 4 – LGV Est
 Corridor 6 – Lyon–Budapest
 Corridor 7 – Paris–Bratislava

See also
High-speed rail in Europe
Trans-European Transport Networks
Trans-European Road network
Trans-European Rail network
Trans-European conventional rail network
Trans-European Inland Waterway network
Motorways of the Sea
Trans-European Seaport network
Trans-European Airport network
Trans-European Combined Transport network

References

Trans-European Rail network
High-speed rail in Europe